Expositiones Mathematicae is a peer-reviewed mathematical journal. The journal was established in 1983. It has been published by Elsevier since 2001. It is published 4 times a year and is edited by Robert C. Dalang.

Abstracting and indexing
The journal is abstracted and indexed in the following bibliographic databases:

References

External links 
 

Mathematics journals
Elsevier academic journals
Publications established in 1983
Quarterly journals